Doti Airport , also known as Silgadhi Airport,  is a domestic airport located in Dipayal Silgadhi  serving Doti District, a district in Sudurpashchim Province in Nepal.

History
The airport started operations on 24 September 1973, but the runway was only blacktopped and upgraded in 2020 for Nepalese Rupees 50 million. It was reinaugurated on 3 October 2020. Scheduled flights to Dhangadhi started in 2022.

Facilities

Airlines and destinations

See also
List of airports in Nepal

References

External links
 

Airports in Nepal
Buildings and structures in Sudurpashchim Province
Buildings and structures in Doti District